America (The Way I See It) is a compilation album by American musician Hank Williams Jr. It was released by Warner Bros./Curb Records in October 1990. "Don't Give Us a Reason" was released as a single. The album peaked at number 11 on the Billboard Top Country Albums chart and has been certified Gold by the RIAA.

Track listing

Chart performance

References

1990 compilation albums
Hank Williams Jr. compilation albums
Warner Records compilation albums
Curb Records compilation albums
Albums produced by Barry Beckett
Albums produced by Jimmy Bowen
Albums produced by Jim Ed Norman